Kes  is a 1969 British kitchen sink drama film directed by Ken Loach (credited as Kenneth Loach) and produced by Tony Garnett, based on the 1968 novel A Kestrel for a Knave, written by the Hoyland Nether–born author Barry Hines. Kes follows the story of Billy, who comes from a dysfunctional working-class family and is a no-hoper at school, but discovers his own private means of fulfillment when he adopts a fledgling kestrel and proceeds to train it in the art of falconry.

The film has been much praised, especially for the performance of the teenage David Bradley, who had never acted before, in the lead role, and for Loach's compassionate treatment of his working-class subject; it remains a biting indictment of the British education system of the time as well as of the limited career options then available to lower-class, unskilled workers in regional Britain. It was ranked seventh in the British Film Institute's Top Ten (British) Films. This was Loach's second feature film for cinema release.

Plot
Fifteen-year-old Billy Casper, growing up in the late 1960s in a poor South Yorkshire community dominated by the local coal mining industry, has little hope in life. He is picked on, both at home by his physically and verbally abusive older half-brother, Jud (who works at the mine), and at school by his schoolmates and abusive teachers. Although he insists that his earlier petty criminal behaviour is behind him, he occasionally steals eggs and milk from milk floats. He has difficulty paying attention in school and is often provoked into tussles with classmates. Billy's father left the family some time ago, and his mother refers to him at one point, while somberly speaking to her friends about her children and their chances in life, as a "hopeless case". Billy is due to leave school soon, as an "Easter Leaver", without taking any public examinations (and therefore no qualifications); Jud states early in the film that he expects Billy will shortly be joining him at work in the mine, whereas Billy says that he does not know what job he will do, but also says nothing would make him work in the mine.

One day, Billy takes a kestrel from a nest on a farm. His interest in learning falconry prompts him to steal a book on the subject from a secondhand book shop, as he is underage and needs – but lies about the reasons he cannot obtain – adult authorisation for a borrower's card from the public library. As the relationship between Billy and "Kes", the kestrel, improves during the training, so does Billy's outlook and horizons. For the first time in the film, Billy receives praise, from his English teacher after delivering an impromptu talk about training Kes.

Jud leaves money and instructions for Billy to place a bet on two horses, but, after consulting a bettor who tells him the horses are unlikely to win, Billy spends the money on fish and chips and intends to purchase meat for his bird (instead the butcher gives him scrap meat free of charge). However, the horses do win. Outraged at losing a payout of more than £10, Jud takes revenge by killing Billy's kestrel. Grief-stricken, Billy retrieves the bird's broken body from the waste bin and, after showing it to Jud and his mother, buries the bird on the hillside overlooking the field where he had flown.

Cast

Background
The film (and the book upon which it was based, by Barry Hines) were semi-autobiographical, Hines having been a teacher in the school in which it was set, and wishing to critique the education system of the time. His younger brother Richard had found a new life after his student experiences at the local secondary modern school by training the original bird "Kes", the inspiration for the movie. Richard assisted the movie production by acting as the handler for the birds in the film. Both brothers grew up in the area shown in the film, and their father was a worker in the local coal mine, though he was a kind man in contrast to the absentee father in the film. Both the film and the book provide a portrait of life in the mining areas of Yorkshire of the time; reportedly, the miners in the area were then the lowest-paid workers in a developed country. Shortly before the film's release, the Yorkshire coalfield where the film was set was brought to a standstill for two weeks by an unofficial strike.

Production
Set in and around Barnsley, the film was one of the first of several collaborations between Ken Loach and Barry Hines that used authentic Yorkshire dialect. The extras were all hired from in and around Barnsley. The DVD version of the film has certain scenes dubbed over with fewer dialect terms than in the original.  In a 2013 interview, director Ken Loach said that, upon its release, United Artists organised a screening of the film for some American executives and they said that they could understand Hungarian better than the dialect in the film.

The production company was set up with the name "Kestrel Films". Ken Loach and Tony Garnett used this for some of their later collaborations such as Family Life and The Save the Children Fund Film.

Filming locations
The film was shot on location, including in St Helens School, Athersley South, and Edward Sheerien School (demolished in 2011); and in and around the streets of Hoyland and Hoyland Common. A number of the shooting locations are detailed in a "then and now" comparison page compiled by Adam Scovell in 2018.

Textual themes
Much of the film's content has been discussed as a critique of the British education system of the time, known as the Tripartite System, which sorted children into different types of schools depending on their academic ability. The view of the creators is that such a system was harmful both to the children involved and to wider society. In his 2006 book, Life After Kes, Simon Golding commented that "Billy Casper, unlike the author [Golding], was a victim of the 11-plus, a government directive that turned out, for those who passed the exam, prospective white-collar workers, fresh from grammar schools, into jobs that were safe and well paid. The failures, housed in secondary modern schools, could only look forward to unskilled manual labour or the dangers of the coal face. Kes protests at this educational void that does not take into account individual skills, and suggests this is a consequence of capitalist society, which demands a steady supply of unskilled labour." Golding also quoted director Ken Loach who stated that, "It [the film] should be dedicated to all the lads who had failed their 11-plus. There's a colossal waste of people and talent, often through schools where full potential is not brought out."

In Ken Loach: The Politics of Film and Television, John Hill noted how the film's producers were against the bleak depiction of educational prospects for children in the film, writing, "Garnett [the film's producer] recalls how, in raising finance for the film, they encountered pressures to make the film's ending more positive, such as having Billy - with the help of his teacher - obtain a job at a zoo. As Garnett observes, however, this would have been to betray the film's point of view, which was concerned to raise questions about 'the system' rather than individuals."

The film has also been noted for its themes around familial bonds during childhood and the effect their absence can have on children. Actor Andrew Garfield, who played Billy in a stage adaptation of Kes early in his career, commented that, "Billy needs to be loved by both his mother and brother. Like any child, he instinctively loves them both. He may resent his mother for not seeming to care about him, but he cannot help but love her. This causes Billy a lot of emotional pain when his mother rejects him. With Jud the rejection is even more blatant; he goes out of his way to hurt Billy, both physically and emotionally. Billy desires approval, comfort, support, guidance and attention from his family, but he receives nothing from them. A hug from his mum would make his day. I believe that love does exist within his family but expressing it is considered to be embarrassing and inappropriate. ... I think that Kes represents to Billy the ideal relationship that he finds so difficult to have with the people around him. Billy trusts, protects and is supported by Kes. He spends all of his time thinking of Kes and day dreaming about her. Billy looks up to Kes and feels privileged to be her friend. Kes has everything that Billy desires: freedom, pride, respect and independence."

Release

Certification
The certificate given to the film has occasionally been reviewed by the British Board of Film Classification, as there is a small amount of swearing, including more than one instance of the word twat. It was originally classified by the then British Board of Film Censors as U for Universal (suitable for children), at a time when the only other certificates were A (more suitable for adult audiences) and X (for showing when no person under 16 years was present ... raised to 18 years in July, 1970). Three years later, Stephen Murphy, the BBFC Secretary, wrote in a letter that it would have been given the new Advisory certificate under the system then in place. Murphy also argued that the word "bugger" is a term of affection and not considered offensive in the area that the film was set. In 1987, the VHS release was given a PG certificate on the grounds of "the frequent use of mild language", and the film has remained PG since that time.

Home media
A digitally restored version of the film was released on DVD and Blu-ray by The Criterion Collection in April 2011. The extras feature a new documentary featuring Loach, Menges, producer Tony Garnett, and actor David Bradley, a 1993 episode of The South Bank Show with Ken Loach, Cathy Come Home (1966), an early television feature by Loach, with an afterword by film writer Graham Fuller, and an alternative, internationally released soundtrack, with postsync dialogue.

Reception
The film was a word-of-mouth hit in Britain, eventually making a profit. However, it was a commercial flop in the US. In his four-star review, Roger Ebert said that the film failed to open in Chicago, and attributed the problems to the Yorkshire accents. Ebert saw the film at a 1972 showing organised by the Biological Honor Society at the Loyola University Chicago, which led him to ask, "were they interested in the movie, or the kestrel?" Nevertheless, he described the film as "one of the best, the warmest, the most moving films of recent years".

Director Krzysztof Kieslowski named it as one of his favorite films.

On review aggregator Rotten Tomatoes, the film holds an approval rating of 100% based on 31 reviews, with an average rating of 9.56/10. The website's critical consensus reads, "A harrowing coming of age tale told simply and truly, Kes is a spare and richly humane tribute to the small pockets of beauty to be found in an oppressive world."

In an essay included with the 2016 Blu-ray release of the film, commentator Philip Kent writes:

Reflecting on changes in the film's locale and setting in the intervening 40-odd years, Graham Fuller wrote in 2011:

Reviewing the film in 2009 for www.frenchfilms.org, James Travers wrote:

Graeme Ross, writing in 2019 in The Independent, placed the film 8th in his "best British movies of all time", saying:

Awards
 1970: Karlovy Vary International Film Festival – Crystal Globe
 1971: Writers' Guild of Great Britain Award – Best British Screenplay
 1971: British Academy Film Awards
 Best Actor in a Supporting Role – Colin Welland
 Most Promising Newcomer to Leading Film Roles – David Bradley

See also

 BFI Top 100 British films

References

Further reading

 Interview with David Bradley.
 A detailed synopsis, referenced background and review of Kes.

External links
 
 
 

1969 films
1960s coming-of-age drama films
1969 drama films
British coming-of-age drama films
1969 independent films
British independent films
Crystal Globe winners
Falconry
Fiction about animal cruelty
Films about birds
Films about bullying
Films based on British novels
Films directed by Ken Loach
Films scored by John Cameron
Films set in mining communities
Films set in Yorkshire
Films shot in South Yorkshire
Films about poverty in the United Kingdom
Social realism in film
United Artists films
1960s English-language films
1960s British films